Bangadilly is an unofficial locality near the Southern Highlands of New South Wales, Australia, in Wingecarribee Shire. Bangadilly was originally recognized as a place name by the Geographical Names Board on the 25 November 1998, but the name was subsequently abandoned due to objections.

References

Towns of the Southern Highlands (New South Wales)